The Bénéteau Figaro 3 is a French racing sailboat design built by Beneteau. It was conceived for the Figaro Solo circuit and the French Solitaire du Figaro in 1990, when the event decided to move to a one design class specifically designed for it purpose. This is the third evolution of the Figaro design as the boat has been changed to match current trends and designed. The design was introduced in December 2016 and marked a change to Van Peteghem Lauriot-Prévost as designer. The boat's key changes were the removal of water ballast and the introduction of hydrofoils, a first for a mass production boat from a large manufacturer.

Events 
 Solitaire du Figaro
 La Transat en Double (Two Person - Bi Annual - Trans Atlantic Race from Concarneau - Saint-Barthélemy)
 Solo Maitre CoQ
 Tour de Bretagne à la Voile
 Sardinha Cup
 Solo Guy Cotten
 The Rolex Fastnet - Class Start

References

External links 
 Class Website
 Figaro 3 on Boats Specs
 Figaro 3 on sailboatdata

Keelboats
Figaro 3
Sailing yachts designed by VPLP
2010s sailboat type designs
Beneteau